James Gerald "Junior" Walsh (March 7, 1919 – November 12, 1990) was an American professional baseball pitcher who appeared in all or part of five seasons in Major League Baseball for the Pittsburgh Pirates (1946, 1948–1951).

Walsh's professional career began in 1941 and was interrupted by two years of United States Army service during World War II. He worked in only 15 total games during his first three trials with the Pirates before sticking with Pittsburgh for the full  and  seasons. For much of Walsh's tenure, the Pirates wallowed at the bottom of the National League standings, and in his 89 total MLB games, he posted a 4–10 won–lost record and 5.88 earned run average, allowing 201 hits and 111 bases on balls in 193 innings pitched, with 91 strikeouts. In 12 starting assignments, Walsh notched one complete game, which was also his only shutout; it came on August 18, 1949, a three-hitter against the Chicago Cubs at Forbes Field. During his time as a relief pitcher, he earned two saves.

Walsh experienced some success during his minor league career, winning 16 games at the highest level as a member of the 1953 Hollywood Stars of the Pacific Coast League. He left baseball in 1956, his 14th professional season, and died in Olyphant, Pennsylvania, at the age of 71.

References

External links

 

1919 births
1990 deaths
Albany Senators players
United States Army personnel of World War II
Baseball players from Newark, New Jersey
Birmingham Barons players
Buffalo Bisons (minor league) players
Hollywood Stars players
Hutchinson Pirates players
Indianapolis Indians players
Major League Baseball pitchers
Oil City Oilers players
Pittsburgh Pirates players
San Francisco Seals (baseball) players
York White Roses players